Ilya Dmitriyevich Ivanyuk (born 9 March 1993) is a Russian athlete specialising in the high jump. He competed at the 2017 World Championships as an authorised neutral athlete finishing sixth and won the bronze medal at the 2018 European Championships. He is also the 2015 European U23 champion.

His personal bests are 2.37 metres outdoors and 2.31 metres indoors (Moscow 2017).

In April 2021, he was granted the status of Authorised Neutral Athlete by World Athletics.
On 7 June 2022, he jumped 2.34 m in	Moscow, Russia, a world leading performance, but he will not participate to the following World Championships in Eugene, Oregon.

International competitions

References

External links

1993 births
Living people
Russian male high jumpers
People from Krasninsky District, Smolensk Oblast
Authorised Neutral Athletes at the World Athletics Championships
European Games silver medalists for Russia
Athletes (track and field) at the 2019 European Games
European Games medalists in athletics
World Athletics Championships medalists
Athletes (track and field) at the 2020 Summer Olympics
Olympic athletes of Russia
Sportspeople from Smolensk Oblast